Eugene Petit Mbende Mbome (born ) is a former Cameroonian-born Hong Kong professional footballer.

Club career

Hong Kong Sapling
Mbome joined Sapling from Pegasus as a foreign player to help the team.

On 22 November 2011, Mbome fainted before training and was taken to Princess Margaret Hospital. He woke up later but remained in hospital for observation.

Pegasus
On 5 January 2012, it was announced that Mbome had returned to Pegasus, as coach Chan Hiu Ming wanted to improve the team's defensive ability in midfield.

Eastern & Metro Gallery
On 12 June 2015, he joined Eastern. However, he was loaned to Metro Gallery for the rest of the season.

Return to Pegasus
Mbome returned to Pegasus at the start of the 2016-17 season.

Tai Po
On 29 July 2019, it was announced that Mbome had joined Tai Po.

International career
Mbome played for the Cameroon national under-17 football team and played as vice-captain of Cameroon U17 for the 2003 African Under-17 Championship and the 2003 FIFA U-17 World Championship.

References

External links
 
 Eugene Mbome at HKFA
 
 

1986 births
Living people
Cameroonian footballers
Hong Kong footballers
Hong Kong First Division League players
Hong Kong Premier League players
Metro Gallery FC players
Eastern Sports Club footballers
TSW Pegasus FC players
Expatriate footballers in Portugal
Cameroonian expatriate sportspeople in Portugal
Expatriate footballers in Hong Kong
Cameroonian expatriate sportspeople in Hong Kong
Dreams Sports Club players
Tai Po FC players
Cameroon youth international footballers
Association football midfielders
S.C. Pombal players